Horridge is a surname, once most common in Lancashire and Yorkshire. Notable people with the surname include:

Adrian Horridge (born 1927), Australian neuroscientist
Roland Horridge (born 1963), English cricketer
John Horridge (born 1893), British Liberal Party politician
Thomas Gardner Horridge (born 1857), judge of the High Court of England and Wales and Liberal politician
Leonard Horridge (born 1907), English cricketer